Shaki is a village in the Sisian Municipality of the Syunik Province in Armenia, located to the north of Sisian. The village's Holy Mother of God Church was opened in 2003. The Shaki Waterfall is located near the village.

Demographics 
The 2011 Armenia census reported its population was 1,197, down from 1,390 at the 2001 census.

Gallery

References 

Populated places in Syunik Province